Bowling is a competitive and recreational sport. Variants include:

 Ten-pin bowling, the most popular type of bowling today
 Nine-pin bowling
 Five-pin bowling, a bowling variant which is played only in Canada 
 Duckpin bowling
 Candlepin bowling
 Trick bowling
 Bowling pin
 Bowling ball
 Bowling pin shooting
 Turkey bowling
 Strike (bowling)
 Bowling at the Summer Olympics
 Bowling form
 World Bowling

Bowling may also refer to:

Sports
 Bowling (cricket), the act of propelling the ball towards the wicket in the sport of cricket
 Bowling analysis
 Bowling average
 Fast bowling
 Seam bowling
 Spin bowling
 Underarm bowling
Bowl game, a North American football match
 Bowling in India
 Feather bowling
 Irish road bowling, a traditional Irish game, played along country roads, involving throwing a metal ball, the winner being the participant whose ball traverses the course in the fewest throws
 Lawn Bowls: a Commonwealth Games and Paralympic Games sport; see Lawn bowls at the Commonwealth Games

Places
 Bowling, Tennessee
 Bowling, West Dunbartonshire, a village in Scotland
 Bowling, Yorkshire, a residential district of Bradford, West Yorkshire, England which is split into:
 East Bowling, part of the electoral ward of Bowling and Barkerend
 West Bowling, part of the electoral ward of Little Horton

Arts, entertainment, and media

Television
 "Bowling" (Malcolm in the Middle), Emmy Award-winning 35th episode of the TV series
 "Bowling"  (The Suite Life of Zack and Cody episode), a 2006 episode from the TV series

Other arts, entertainment, and media
 Bowling (solitaire)
 Bowling (video game), a 1978 video game for the Atari 2600
 "The Bowling Song", a song by Raffi

Other uses
 Bowling (surname), a surname
 Bowling Green State University
 Bowling Green–Toledo football rivalry
 Bowling Green–South Ferry shuttle

See also
 Bowl (disambiguation)
 Bowler (disambiguation)
 Bowling green (disambiguation)